Walden Township is the name of some places in the U.S. state of Minnesota:
Walden Township, Cass County, Minnesota
Walden Township, Pope County, Minnesota

Minnesota township disambiguation pages